Pilea trilobata is an endemic Mauritian plant from the genus Pilea within the family Urticaceae. It was first described by botanist Hugh Algernon Weddell in 1854. It was thought to be extinct since 1849 until it was rediscovered in April 2005 in the Corps de Garde Nature Reserve.

References

trilobata
Endemic flora of Mauritius
Plants described in 1854